The 1968 New South Wales Rugby Football League premiership was the 61st season of professional rugby league football in Australia. Twelve teams, including six Sydney-based foundation teams and another six from around Sydney competed for the J.J. Giltinan Shield and the WD & HO Wills Cup during the season, which culminated in a grand final between South Sydney and Manly-Warringah.

Season summary
The 1968 season's Rothmans Medallist was Cronulla-Sutherland's Terry Hughes.

The Balmain club narrowly missed out on a place in the top four, which was made up of South Sydney, Manly-Warringah, St. George and Eastern Suburbs.

Teams

Ladder

Finals

Grand Final

Manly was making its fourth ever Grand Final appearance and still looking for its first title. 21-year-old captain Bob Fulton led a young Sea Eagles side, while Souths was skippered by John Sattler who that season had been honoured as "Catholic Sportsman of the Year". Neither team lineup had any players older than 29 years of age. The depth of the Souths line-up was indicated by the fact that it’s stars Kevin Longbottom, Bob McCarthy and Ray Branighan were all named and played in the Rabbitohs' reserve grade side which ominously won its grand final match-up also against Manly.

The first-grade match began furiously with the toughening-up period resulting in four cautions by referee Pearce in the first four minutes. Ron Coote clashed with Bill Bradstreet and the opposing giants Hamilton and John O'Neill also measured up. Souths, with a strong breeze at its back, was the first to score when Michael Cleary intercepted a pass meant for Manly winger Les Hanigan and raced 80 yards to score. Simms punished Manly with a conversion and three successful penalty goals in the first half and at the break Souths led 11–2.

The Sea Eagles refused to lay down and mid-way through the second half second-rower John Morgan crashed over for a try which was converted by Bob Batty. Then a Bob Fulton field goal with fourteen minutes left brought Manly within reach. But despite the Manly fightback Souths was too resilient and hung on to win its second successive premiership and the club's 18th title.

 South Sydney 13 (Tries: Cleary. Goals: Simms 5.)

 Manly-Warringah 9 (Tries: Morgan. Goals: Batty 2. Fld Goals: Fulton 1.)

Player statistics
The following statistics are as of the conclusion of Round 22.

Top 5 point scorers

Top 5 try scorers

Top 5 goal scorers

References

External links
 Rugby League Tables – Season 1968 The World of Rugby League
Results:1961-70 at rabbitohs.com.au
1968 J J Giltinan Shield and WD & HO Wills Cup at rleague.com
NSWRFL season 1968 at rugbyleagueproject.com

New South Wales Rugby League premiership
NSWRFL season